Heyman Dullaert or Dullaart (6 February 1636, in Rotterdam – 6 May 1684, in Rotterdam) was a Dutch Golden Age painter and poet.

Biography

He was a student of Rembrandt, but was better known for his poetry than for his artwork. His paintings, often trompe-l'œils, can be seen in the Kröller-Müller Museum.

As a poet he is remembered for his love sonnets Aan myne uitbrandende kaerse and Een korenwanner aan de winden, recently republished in De Nederlandse poëzie van de 17e en 18e eeuw by Gerrit Komrij.

References 

1636 births
1684 deaths
17th-century Dutch poets
Dutch Golden Age painters
Dutch male painters
Trompe-l'œil artists
Dutch Golden Age writers
Dutch male poets
Painters from Rotterdam
Pupils of Rembrandt